Borrowes is a surname. Notable people with the surname include:

 Kildare Borrowes (disambiguation), multiple people, including:
Sir Kildare Borrowes, 3rd Baronet (c. 1660–1709), Irish MP for Kildare County 1703–1709
Sir Kildare Borrowes, 5th Baronet (c. 1721–1790), his grandson, Irish MP for Kildare County 1745–1776
 Walter Borrowes (1691–1741) Irish politician
 Borrowes baronets

See also
 Borrows, surname